Abu Qubays may refer to the following places:

Abu Qubays (mountain), a mountain near Mecca, Saudi Arabia
Abu Qubays, Syria, a fortress and village in Syria